Baryshivka is an urban-type settlement in Kyiv Oblast (province) of Ukraine. It hosts the administration of Baryshivka settlement hromada, one of the hromadas of Ukraine. Population: . In 2001, population was 11,178.

Until 18 July 2020, Baryshivka was the administrative center of Baryshivka Raion. The raion was abolished that day as part of the administrative reform of Ukraine, which reduced the number of raions of Kyiv Oblast to seven. The area of Baryshivka Raion was merged into Brovary Raion.

References

External links
Website of the city Baryshivka 
Independent website of the Baryshivka town and region 

Urban-type settlements in Brovary Raion
Pereyaslavsky Uyezd